Doline is a common name for a sinkhole. 

Doline may also refer to:

 Doline (Kanjiža), a village in the Kanjiža municipality, Serbia
 Doline, Kneževo, a settlement in Kneževo, Bosnia and Herzegovina
 Doline (Prnjavor), a settlement in Republika Srpska, Bosnia and Herzegovina
 Doline (Srbobran), a hamlet in Vojvodina, Serbia
 Doline, a hamlet in Bukovski Vrh in the Littoral region of Slovenia

See also
 Dolina (disambiguation)